Albert Byron Potter Sr. (January 8, 1872 – January 26, 1961) was an American football coach.  He was the fourth head football coach at Drake University Des Moines, Iowa, serving for three seasons, from 1897 to 1899, and compiling a record of 11–7.

Potter attended Northwestern University, where he was a dental student. He later worked as a dentist based in Oklahoma City, Oklahoma, where he died in 1961.

Head coaching record

References

External links
 

1872 births
1961 deaths
19th-century players of American football
American dentists
Drake Bulldogs football coaches
Northwestern Wildcats football players
Northwestern University Dental School alumni
People from Pella, Iowa